Dandenong City Soccer Club, formerly known as Chelsea Hajduk, is an Australian soccer club based in the South-East region of Melbourne, Victoria. The club's home is at Frank Holohan Soccer Complex in the suburb of Endeavour Hills. They compete in the NPL Victoria, which is the top tier of football in Victoria, having been promoted for the first time for the 2019 season.

The club was founded in 1981 as Parkmore Hajduk, then was renamed Chelsea Hajduk by the Croatian Australian community in Melbourne's south-eastern suburbs. In 2008 Chelsea Hajduk merged with Dandenong City, keeping the latter's name.

History
In 2008, Dandenong City Soccer Club was approached by Chelsea Soccer Club about a possible merger of the two clubs. Chelsea was competing in Victorian State League 2 at the time. Chelsea SC, known colloquially as Hajduk, after the Croatian football club HNK Hajduk Split, had around 250 juniors and 350 total players at the club, struggling to accommodate all of its sides. The amalgamation was finalised in December 2008. The newly combined club kept the name Dandenong City Soccer Club and continued to play out of the former's home ground of Frank Holohan Soccer Complex. 

Dandenong City finished in fourth place in the 2009 Victorian State League Division Two South-East its first season as a new club. In 2010, former National Soccer League and A-League striker Ante Milicic was signed by the club. In 2011, Dandy City won its first championship since the amalgamation, taking out State League Two South-East and earning promotion to State League One. City were relegated in 2012, finishing in 11th place in the 12 team league, with only rivals Springvale White Eagles finishing lower. In 2013, Dandenong City finished in second place in the Victorian State League 2 Two South-East, but missed out on promotion to State League 1 after losing a playoff against Avondale FC.

This was not to matter, though, as through City's acceptance into the National Premier Leagues Victoria 1 in 2014 meant that the club jumped from the old third to the new second tier of soccer in Victoria. In City's maiden campaign in NPL1, the side endured a largely challenging campaign, finishing 10th in the 14 team competition. Ivan Duzel led the side throughout 2014, but departed at season's end. The club found success in the promotion of young players in the senior squad, with Marko Stevanja, Nick Glavan and Damian Miskulin all impressing with the first team and going on to sign with National Youth League sides Melbourne City FC (Stevanja) and Melbourne Victory FC (Glavan and Miskulin).

Dandenong City appointed Aaron Healey as the head coach for the upcoming 2015 season. Healey was previously the club's technical director. The NPL1 division split into an East and West conference in 2015, with both conferences compromising of 10 teams, playing each team in their own conference twice and the teams in the opposite conference once. Dandenong finished 3rd in the East conference, seven points off the second-placed Melbourne Victory FC Youth. A highlight of the season came in a 5–0 win over promoted side Melbourne Victory at the Frank Holohan Soccer Complex.

City experienced an inconsistent first half of the season in 2016, entering the mid-season transfer window in 4th place in NPL2 East, with 7 wins, 2 draws and 5 losses, 12 points off the promotion play-off second place. It finished the 2016 season in 3rd place, 21 points off second-placed neighbours Dandenong Thunder. Following the side's final round 3–2 loss to Box Hill United, City announced the departure of senior coach Aaron Healey and his assistant Gerry McDonagh.

For the 2017 NPL2 East season, City announced that Stuart Munro had been appointed as the club's new senior head coach, with former Melbourne Victory midfielder Tom Pondeljak named as his assistant. Dandy started its 2017 recruitment in sensational fashion, securing the services of Adelaide United FC A-League championship winning winger Mate Dugandzic. The club also signed former A-League players Nick Kalmar and Ljubo Milicevic. City finished the regular season in second place, 11 points off league champions Thunder. Shaun Filipović took out the golden boot with 19 goals. After defeating Moreland Zebras in the promotion playoff, Dandenong City faced Melbourne Knights FC, with the winner taking a spot in the National Premier Leagues Victoria top flight for 2018. A Kym Harris hattrick saw Knights race out to a 3–0 lead. Two goals in the last five minutes gave City hope, but the match ultimately ended 3–2 and Knights kept its spot in the NPL.

After three seasons of coming close, Dandenong City, under the management of Željko Kuzman, finally achieved promotion to the top flight in 2018, after taking out the NPL2 East league title.   

The 2019 season was the first time in the club's history competing in the state's top flight. For their debut season in the NPL Victoria top division, City signed former professional footballers Petar Franjic, Diogo Ferreira and Mark Ochieng. In April 2019, after a win, a draw and seven losses in the 2019 season, including a 4–3 loss to local rivals Thunder after leading the game 3–0, Kuzman and assistant coach Steve Bebić departed the club. The club appointed former National Soccer League footballer Ante Moric as the new senior head coach, with former Socceroo Saša Ognenovski also joining the coaching staff. In the mid-season transfer window, City released Franjic, Ferreira and Ochieng, but bolstered the squad with three high-profile signings in Adrian Leijer, Carl Valeri and Brendon Santalab. The new coaching staff and new players were able to turn the club's fortunes around, with Dandy finishing in 7th place. In the post-season, Dandenong City hosted the 45th Australian-Croatian Soccer Tournament for the first time and became champions also for the first time, with a 1–0 win over NPL Queensland champions Gold Coast Knights.

In the post-season, head coach Moric took up a position with new A-League side Western United FC and Ognenovski was appointed as Dandenong City's coach for the 2020 season.

Squad

Senior coaching staff
Technical Director of Football: Ljuban Palinić
First Team Coach:

Honours
Australian-Croatian Soccer Tournament Champions: 2019
Australian-Croatian Soccer Tournament Runner-Up: 2005, 2012
Victorian State League Division 2 South-East Champions: 2011
Victorian State League Division 3 South-East Champions: 2004
Victorian Provisional League Division 1 South-East Champions: 2003
Victorian Provisional League Division 1 Champions: 1987
Victorian Amateur League Division 1 Champions: 1982
Victorian Provisional Cup Winners: 2003

Bayside Football Association
Division 1 Winner – Dandenong Thirds: 2010
Division 2 Winner – Dandenong Thirds: 2009
Bayside FA Cup Runner-Up – Dandenong Thirds: 2009
Division 2 Runner-Up – Chelsea Old Boys: 2008
Premier League Winner – Chelsea Young Boys: 2005
Division 1 Winner – Chelsea Young Boys: 2004
Division 2 Runner-Up – Chelsea Old Boys: 2004
Division 2 Winner – Chelsea Young Boys: 2003
Division 3 Winner – Chelsea Old Boys: 2003

Senior team finishing position
1980 – District League Division Three (8th)
1981 – District League Division Three (6th)
1982 – Amateur League Division One (1st – promoted)
1983 – Provisional League Division Four (8th)
Hajduk Parkmore merged with Chelsea
1984 – Provisional League Division One (5th)
1985 – Victorian Provisional League Division One (12th – relegated)
1986 – Victorian Provisional League Division Two (2nd – promoted)
1987 – Victorian Provisional League Division One (1st – promoted)
1988 –Victorian League Division Four (2nd – promoted)
1989 – Victorian League Division Three (2nd – promoted)
1990 – Victorian League Division Two (5th)
1991 – State League Division Two (?)
1992 – State League Division Two (7th)
1993 – State League Division Two (7th)
1994 – State League Division Two (8th)
1995 – State League Division Two (11th – relegated)
1996 – State League Division Three (13th)
1997 – State League Division Three (3rd)
1998 – State League Division Three (14th – relegated)
1999 – State League Division Four (13th)
2000 – State League Division Three South-East (3rd)
2001 – State League Division Three South-East (5th)
2002 – State League Division Three South-East (11th – relegated)
2003 – Provisional League Division One South-East (1st – promoted)
2004 – State League Division Three South-East (1st – promoted)
2005 – State League Division Two South-East (5th)
2006 – State League Division Two South-East (8th)
2007 – State League Division Two South-East (7th)
2008 – State League Division Two South-East (4th)
Hajduk Chelsea merged with Dandenong City
2009 – State League Division Two South-East (4th)
2010 – State League Division Two South-East (7th)
2011 – State League Division Two South-East (1st – promoted)
2012 – State League Division One (11th – relegated)
2013 – State League Division Two South-East (2nd)
2014 – National Premier Leagues Victoria 2 (10th)
2015 – National Premier Leagues Victoria 2 (3rd East, 7th Overall)
2016 – National Premier Leagues Victoria 2 (3rd East, 7th Overall)
2017 – National Premier Leagues Victoria 2 (2nd East, 4th Overall, Lost Promotion Playoff)
2018 – National Premier Leagues Victoria 2 (1st – promoted)
2019 – National Premier Leagues Victoria (7th Overall – 1st YEAR in NPL)

See also
List of Croatian soccer clubs in Australia
Australian-Croatian Soccer Tournament
Croatian Australian
Croatian Eagles

References

External links
Official Website of Dandenong City SC
Article about Chelsea players in the Olyroo squad

Croatian sports clubs in Australia
Association football clubs established in 2008
Soccer clubs in Melbourne
Dandenong, Victoria
Sport in the City of Casey